The 1965 Railway Cup Hurling Championship was the 39th staging of the Railway Cup since its establishment by the Gaelic Athletic Association in 1927. The cup started on 21 February 1965 and ended on 17 March 1965.

Leinster were the defending champions.

On 17 March 1965, Leinster won the cup following a 3-11 to 0-09 defeat of Munster in the final. This was their 10th Railway Cup title and their first since 1962.

Leinster's Eddie Keher was the top scorer with 3-04.

Results

Semi-finals

Final

Scoring statistics

Top scorers overall

Top scorers in a single game

Bibliography

 Donegan, Des, The Complete Handbook of Gaelic Games (DBA Publications Limited, 2005).

References

Railway Cup Hurling Championship
1965 in hurling